The Mindoro shrew (Crocidura mindorus) is a species of mammal in the family Soricidae. It is endemic to the Philippines.

References

Sources
 Insectivore Specialist Group 1996.  Crocidura mindorus.   2006 IUCN Red List of Threatened Species.   Downloaded on 30 July 2007.

Crocidura
Mammals of the Philippines
Endemic fauna of the Philippines
Fauna of Mindoro
Mammals described in 1910
Taxonomy articles created by Polbot